John Matsko (born February 2, 1951) is an American football offensive line coach who coached for several college football and National Football League (NFL) teams.

Coaching career
Matsko was hired by the Baltimore Ravens in January 2008; he was fired in January 2011. The next day, he was hired by the Carolina Panthers to work under head coach Ron Rivera and offensive coordinator Rob Chudzinski. Prior to being hired in Baltimore, Matsko held the same position for the Kansas City Chiefs during the 2006 and 2007 seasons. Prior to that, Matsko coached professionally for the Arizona Cardinals, New Orleans Saints, New York Giants, and St. Louis Rams.

In the 2015 season, Matsko and the Panthers reached Super Bowl 50 on February 7, 2016. The Panthers fell to the Denver Broncos by a score of 24–10.

Matsko coached at the college football level at Kent State, Miami (Ohio), North Carolina, Navy, Arizona and USC.

In January 2020, Matsko joined the Washington Football Team, then known as the Redskins, as their offensive line coach under new head coach Ron Rivera. In March 2023, Matsko was fired following the hiring of new offensive coordinator Eric Bieniemy.

College career
Matsko played at Kent State University.

References

1951 births
Living people
Arizona Wildcats football coaches
Baltimore Ravens coaches
Carolina Panthers coaches
Kansas City Chiefs coaches
Kent State Golden Flashes football players
Miami RedHawks football coaches
Navy Midshipmen football coaches
New Orleans Saints coaches
New York Giants coaches
North Carolina Tar Heels football coaches
Phoenix Cardinals coaches
St. Louis Rams coaches
USC Trojans football coaches
High school football coaches in Ohio
Sportspeople from Cleveland
Washington Commanders coaches
Washington Football Team coaches
Players of American football from Cleveland